Sergio Damián Santín Francia (born 22 September 1980) is a Colombian-born Uruguayan football manager and former player who played as a defender. He is the current manager of Fénix.

He played for several clubs in the South America, including Danubio, Olimpo, Atlético Nacional and Bella Vista.

External links
 
 Player profile 

1980 births
Living people
People from Cúcuta
Colombian footballers
Uruguayan footballers
Association football defenders
Deportivo Maldonado players
Villa Española players
C.A. Rentistas players
Instituto footballers
Danubio F.C. players
Centro Atlético Fénix players
Sociedade Esportiva e Recreativa Caxias do Sul players
Club Olimpo footballers
Atlético Nacional footballers
C.A. Bella Vista players
CSyD Tristán Suárez footballers
Colombian emigrants to Uruguay
Uruguayan expatriate sportspeople in Argentina
Uruguayan expatriate sportspeople in Brazil
Expatriate footballers in Argentina
Expatriate footballers in Brazil
Uruguayan football managers
Racing Club de Montevideo managers
Centro Atlético Fénix managers